McKenzie Windmill is a historic windmill on Tennessee State Route 58 in Georgetown, Tennessee.

The windmill was built in 1931 and added to the National Register of Historic Places in 1982. At the time of its listing, it was the only windmill in Meigs County.

References

Windmills completed in 1931
Buildings and structures in Meigs County, Tennessee
Windmills on the National Register of Historic Places
Agricultural buildings and structures on the National Register of Historic Places in Tennessee
Wind power in Tennessee
Agricultural buildings and structures in Tennessee
National Register of Historic Places in Meigs County, Tennessee
1931 establishments in Tennessee